Pixley Ka Seme Local Municipality is a South African local municipality situated in the Gert Sibande District Municipality, of Mpumalanga. Volksrust is the seat of the municipality.

The municipality is named after Pixley ka Isaka Seme, a founder and president of the African National Congress.

Main places
The 2001 census divided the municipality into the following main places:

Politics 

The municipal council consists of twenty-one members elected by mixed-member proportional representation. Eleven councillors are elected by first-past-the-post voting in eleven wards, while the remaining ten are chosen from party lists so that the total number of party representatives is proportional to the number of votes received. In the election of 1 November 2021 the African National Congress (ANC) won a majority of thirteen seats on the council.

The following table shows the results of the election.

References

External links
 https://web.archive.org/web/20120519015508/http://pixleykaseme.local.gov.za/

Local municipalities of the Gert Sibande District Municipality